Magnhild Meltveit Kleppa (born 12 November 1948 in Fister, Norway) is a Norwegian politician for the Centre Party.

Kleppa is educated as a teacher at Kristiansand Teacher Training College in 1970. She worked as a teacher from 1967 to 1992. She was a member of the Hjelmeland municipal council during the 1980s and a member of the Norwegian Parliament from 1993 until 2013. She then served as Governor of Rogaland County from 2013-2019.

Political career
She was elected to the Parliament of Norway for the first time in 1993, and has been reelected four times, lastly in 2009. She did not seek reelection in the 2013 Norwegian parliamentary election. Her political advisor is fellow Centre Party member Sigrid Brattabø Handegard.

She was the Minister of Social Affairs from 17 Oct 1997 until 17 March 2000. From 17 October 2005 until 21 September 2007, she was the parliamentary leader for the Centre Party. She was appointed Norwegian Minister of Local Government and Regional Development on 21 September 2007, a post she held until 20  October 2009 when she swapped departments and became Minister of Transport and Communications.  She continued in that role until 18 June 2012. On 1 November 2013, she became the County Governor of Rogaland.  She retired in 2019 after having originally stated she was retiring in November 2018.

References

1948 births
Norwegian Christians
Living people
Government ministers of Norway
Members of the Storting
Women members of the Storting
Centre Party (Norway) politicians
Ministers of Transport and Communications of Norway
Ministers of Local Government and Modernisation of Norway
21st-century Norwegian politicians
21st-century Norwegian women politicians
20th-century Norwegian politicians
20th-century Norwegian women politicians
Women government ministers of Norway